Eslamabad (also Romanized as Eslāmābād; also known as Āṣlāḥābād, and Shāh Bakhsh) is a village in Belharat Rural District, Miyan Jolgeh District, Nishapur County, Razavi Khorasan Province, Iran. At the 2006 census, its population was 712, in 180 families.

References 

Populated places in Nishapur County